The House of the Arrow is a 1930 British mystery film directed by Leslie S. Hiscott and starring Dennis Neilson-Terry, Benita Hume and Richard Cooper. It was based on the 1924 book The House of the Arrow, and its subsequent stage play adaptation by A.E.W. Mason, part of his Inspector Hanaud series. It was one of four film adaptations of the story. It was made at Twickenham Studios. A quota quickie, it was distributed by the American company Warner Brothers. A separate French-language version La Maison de la Fléche was also produced at Twickenham directed by Henri Fescourt.

A follow up film At the Villa Rose was made in 1930 with the same director. Austin Trevor replaced Terry as Inspector Hanaud.

Cast
 Dennis Neilson-Terry as Inspector Hanuad
 Benita Hume as Betty Harlow
 Richard Cooper as Jim Frobisher
 Stella Freeman as Ann Upcott
 Wilfred Fletcher as Wabersky
 Tony De Lungo as Maurice Thevene
 Barbara Gott as Mrs Harlow
 Betty de Malero as Francine

References

Bibliography
 Chibnall, Steve. Quota Quickies: The Birth of the British 'B' Film. British Film Institute, 2007.
 Low, Rachael. Filmmaking in 1930s Britain. George Allen & Unwin, 1985.
 Wood, Linda. British Films, 1927-1939. British Film Institute, 1986.

External links

1930 films
British detective films
1930s English-language films
Films directed by Leslie S. Hiscott
Films based on British novels
Films based on mystery novels
British multilingual films
Films shot at Twickenham Film Studios
Quota quickies
British black-and-white films
1930 mystery films
British mystery films
1930 multilingual films
1930s British films